How Do I Love Thee? is a 1970 American comedy-drama film directed by Michael Gordon. It stars Jackie Gleason and Maureen O'Hara and is based on Peter De Vries's 1965 novel Let Me Count the Ways.

Plot
Tom Waltz, a college professor, finds out that Stanley, his father, is in Lourdes, France. He quickly catches a flight there over his wife Marion's objections.

Stanley is a furniture mover, happily married to Elsie but tempted by Lena, an artist. No actual affair takes place, but Lena does give him a poem as a parting gift that Stanley later enters in a contest. He wins a $10,000 prize and donates the money to Tom's department at the university. Tom is rewarded with a promotion over his rival, Littlefield.

Trouble develops when the "original" poem is exposed as being one of Elizabeth Barrett Browning's sonnets. Littlefield gets the job and Tom's reputation is sullied. Stanley prays for divine intervention and Littlefield promptly dies. Stanley flies to Lourdes to atone and pray for forgiveness, but is relieved when Tom informs him that Littlefield's death occurred before his request for help from above.

Cast
Jackie Gleason as Stanley Waltz
Maureen O'Hara as Elsie Waltz
Shelley Winters as Lena Mervin
Rosemary Forsyth as Marion Waltz
Rick Lenz as Tom Waltz
Jeffrey Orloff as University of Miami student wearing TKE shirt during campus demonstration

Production notes
Filming began in Florida in June 1969. Maureen O'Hara, who accepted the role after a five year absence from the screen, later said she regretted making the film because the script was bad and there were numerous problems on the set.

Reception
How Do I Love Thee? premiered in Los Angeles on October 1, 1970. It was a box office failure and recorded an overall loss of $2,425,000. It earned rentals of $150,000 in North America and $125,000 in other countries.

Home media
How Do I Love Thee? was released on Region 1 Blu-ray by Kino Lorber Studio Classics on May 15, 2018.

See also
 List of American films of 1970

References

External links
 
 
 

1970 films
1970 comedy-drama films
American comedy-drama films
Films based on American novels
Films directed by Michael Gordon
Films shot in Florida
Cinerama Releasing Corporation films
1970 comedy films
1970 drama films
1970s English-language films
1970s American films